Ignacio Ruiz (born 15 March 1948) is an Argentine rower. He competed at the 1972 Summer Olympics and the 1976 Summer Olympics.

References

1948 births
Living people
Argentine male rowers
Olympic rowers of Argentina
Rowers at the 1972 Summer Olympics
Rowers at the 1976 Summer Olympics
Place of birth missing (living people)
Pan American Games medalists in rowing
Pan American Games gold medalists for Argentina
Rowers at the 1971 Pan American Games